Shehadie is a surname. Notable people with the surname include:

Nicholas Shehadie (1926–2018), Lord Mayor of Sydney (1973–1975) and Australian rugby union captain
Rob Shehadie (born 1977), Australian actor, writer, and stand up comedian of Lebanese descent